Chantilly is a historic archaeological site located near Montross, Westmoreland County, Virginia. The site was the home of U.S. Founding Father Richard Henry Lee (1732-1794) in his later years.

It was listed on the National Register of Historic Places in 1971.

References

External links
Rivah Research: Westmoreland County History & Genealogy

Lee family residences
Archaeological sites on the National Register of Historic Places in Virginia
National Register of Historic Places in Westmoreland County, Virginia
1763 establishments in Virginia
Homes of United States Founding Fathers